TV Bel Kanal or  is a local commercial television channel based in Banja Luka, Bosnia and Herzegovina. The program is mainly produced in Serbian. TV station was established in 2003. TV Bel reports on local events in Banja Luka, Republika Srpska entity and BiH.

The channel broadcasts documentaries from domestic and foreign production, TV series, movies and entertainment. Channel is also part of local news network in the RS entity called PRIMA mreža.

References

External links 
 www.belkanal.tv
 Communications Regulatory Agency of Bosnia and Herzegovina

Mass media in Banja Luka
Television stations in Bosnia and Herzegovina
Television channels and stations established in 2003